The Strawberry Blonde is a 1941 American romantic comedy film directed by Raoul Walsh, starring James Cagney and Olivia de Havilland, and featuring Rita Hayworth, Alan Hale, Jack Carson, and George Tobias. Set in New York City around 1900, it features songs of that era such as "The Band Played On", "Bill Bailey", "Meet Me in St. Louis, Louie", "Wait Till The Sun Shines Nellie", and "Love Me and the World Is Mine". It was nominated for an Academy Award in 1941 for Best Scoring of a Musical Picture. The title is most often listed beginning with the word The (as it appears in the opening credits), but the film's posters and promotional materials called it simply Strawberry Blonde. 
 
The film was a more lighthearted remake of the 1933 non-musical movie One Sunday Afternoon, directed by Stephen Roberts and starring Gary Cooper. Unlike that earlier picture, it was a hit. In 1948, Walsh directed a third version of the story, also called One Sunday Afternoon, featuring early 20th-century songs combined with original musical numbers.

Plot
The movie runs as a long flashback in the 1890's in New York City and opening with Biff Grimes (James Cagney) as an unsuccessful dentist on a Sunday without work. Hugo Barnstead (Jack Carson), an old partner,  nemesis and rival makes a desperate appointment to see him.  As Biff considers killing Hugo when he gives him nitrous oxide, the flashback begins.

Biff falls in love with strawberry-blonde society girl Virginia Brush (Rita Hayworth). However, Biff's more enterprising "pal", Hugo, wins Virginia's affections. Biff ends up marrying Virginia's less-glamorous best friend, Amy Lind (Olivia de Havilland), who Biff eventually realizes was the right one for him all along.

Cast
 James Cagney as T. L. 'Biff' Grimes
 Olivia de Havilland as Amy Lind
 Rita Hayworth as Virginia Brush
 Alan Hale as William 'Old Man' Grimes
 Jack Carson as Hugo Barnstead
 George Tobias as Nicholas Pappalas
 Una O'Connor as Mrs. Timothy Mulcahey
 George Reeves as Harold
 Lucile Fairbanks as Harold's girlfriend
 Edward McNamara as Big Joe 
 Helen Lynd as Josephine 
 Herbert Heywood as Toby 
 Russell Hicks as Treadway (uncredited) 
 Frank Mayo as Policeman (uncredited) 
 Jack Mower as Streetcleaner (uncredited)
 Nan Wynn as Rita Hayworth's singing voice (uncredited)

Development and production
Both the director of Strawberry Blonde, Raoul Walsh, and its star James Cagney came to the project looking for a change of pace. Walsh had just completed the dark Humphrey Bogart/Ida Lupino vehicle High Sierra, shot largely on location, and the good notices the film received had Walsh "as fired up as Jack Warner to keep the ball rolling on projects in development and production." The transition between the outdoorsy film noir and the light and sentimental studio-centered Strawberry Blonde "proved no problem" for Walsh.

Cagney had earned his stripes with Warner Bros. in the early 1930s playing tough guys, but he also had shown his talents at lighter, musical material in films like Footlight Parade (1933) He left the studio in mid-decade, then returned in 1938 with a contract that gave him more control in choosing roles and brought his younger brother William Cagney onboard as assistant producer and informal buffer between himself and studio executives. But Cagney soon found himself getting slotted right back into tough guy parts and by 1940, he "wanted a nostalgic part—any part—to take him away from the gangsters he was now loathe [sic] to play."

A property on the lot that might fill that bill was One Sunday Afternoon. It had started out early in 1933 as a successful Broadway play by James Hagan and had been adapted later that year by Paramount as a vehicle for Gary Cooper. But it was "the only real flop of Cooper's stellar and carefully orchestrated career"—and the only Cooper picture ever to lose money. James Cagney had qualms about it because it would be a remake, and Jack Warner knew it needed "complete retooling."  But it was a "pet project" of William Cagney, who saw it as a "gift to [the brothers'] mother, Carrie Cagney, who would live only a few more years" and Warner recognized the inside track that would give him with his often recalcitrant star. Warner screened the 1933 film and wrote a memo to his production head Hal B. Wallis telling him to watch it also: "It will be hard to stay through the entire running of the picture, but do this so you will know what not to do."

Wallis knew the trick was to tailor the script as a vehicle for Cagney, who had yet to commit, either to the project or even to his brother. Wallis had a first draft screenplay done by Stephen Morehouse Avery that satisfied no one; he called in the Epstein brothers, Julius and Phillip, for another vision—one that might hook Cagney into the project. The brothers and William all concurred that the first thing to do was move things from the play's midwest setting to New York City, "since they all knew it so much better." Said Julius: "We thought the reason [the Cooper film] lost money was it was too bucolic. It took place in a little country town. We said 'Change it to the big city. Put it in New York.'" The Epstein version quickly took shape, aided by the objective of making it a Cagney picture. "When we went on the rewrite," Julius said, "we knew it was for Cagney. That was a help."

Yet still Cagney was reluctant. Wallis was getting impatient; he considered the emerging John Garfield for the role of Biff Grimes. By July 1940, concern about the impasse stretched all the way to New York, where Harry Warner cabled brother Jack that he was willing to give Cagney 10% of the gross. Then Cagney began to budge. One issue was that he didn't want to play scenes with the much-taller Jack Carson; he would prefer the shorter Brian Donlevy, or the shorter-still Lloyd Nolan. The problem was, Nolan commanded $2,000 a week while Carson got just $750. Despite Cagney's misgivings, Carson was cast as Hugo Barnstead.

More problematic was the casting of the Virginia Brush role, which was originally created for Ann Sheridan, the studio's "Oomph Girl". But Sheridan was in one of her contract disputes with the studio and refused to do the film. Jack Warner asked Walsh to talk Sheridan into it, but she still refused. Wallis tested actress Brenda Marshall for the part, but Walsh spoke up about "a girl" he had seen in several Columbia pictures: young Rita Hayworth. "He thought she was perfect for the part, and after she was signed without a hitch, from then on he always referred to Hayworth as his 'find' (despite [the splash she had made in] Only Angels Have Wings released in 1939)."

Hayworth received $450 a week for the film and began work immediately with makeup man Perc Westmore to find the look for the title character in what would soon be retitled Strawberry Blonde. After shooting test footage and many stills of his makeup experiments, Westmore memoed Wallis: "Her head is so large and she has so much hair that it will practically be impossible to put a wig on her. Whatever color you decide on, she will be happy to have it made that color. Then at the end of the picture, we will dye it back to its natural color." This film marked the first time Hayworth was seen as a redhead and the only time that audiences heard her real singing voice.

The shooting of Strawberry Blonde began on October 21, 1940. Wallis and Walsh quickly came to loggerheads. The producer thought his director was coming in too close on the actors, that the close-ups decreased the nostalgia by obscuring the period backgrounds. Wallis's October 29, 1940 memo chided "You have so much opportunity on this picture for atmosphere and composition... and I hate like hell to see them go by without full advantage being taken of what we have." (Several months later, with Michael Curtiz on Yankee Doodle Dandy, Wallis's complaints would be just the opposite: "Mike, get the story from the actors' faces, instead of going all over the place.") Walsh in reality had "memorized the entire script and had worked out every camera angle and move—a visual map of just how he would shoot." As the footage continued to flow in, the memos slowed, then stopped.

Olivia de Havilland had no idea of the friction between the two, no problem with the closeups, and she debunked Walsh's reputation as a tough guy. "I loved working with Raoul. He seemed to understand perfectly the characters we were playing, and to understand, too, the 'actor' approach to them. It was a happy, harmonious set, a happy picture to make." The screenwriters too found Walsh a good boss. Julius Epstein said he "was great. He was very businesslike. He didn't change a word on The Strawberry Blonde. Some writers complained about Walsh. My experience with him was very good."

When Warner Bros. released Strawberry Blonde on February 21, 1941, "the studio knew it had a hit on its hands." Walsh considered it his most successful picture to date, and from then on would call it his favorite film.

Reception

Critic Bosley Crowther praised Strawberry Blonde in a New York Times February 1941 review, calling it "lusty, affectionate, and altogether winning." Part of its "amiable, infectious quality", he wrote, came from its cast: "James Cagney, true to form, is excellent as the pugnacious and proud little guy who 'don't take nothing from nobody' cause that's the kind of hairpin he is. Olivia de Havilland is sweet and sympathetic as the girl he marries and Rita Hayworth makes a classic 'flirt' of the one who got away." Part of it also came from the screenplay by Casablanca writers Julius J. and Philip G. Epstein: they took "the little play, One Sunday Afternoon... and fashioned from it a gas-lit comedy, laced with sentimental romance, about a fellow who thinks he's been played for a chump, but, in the end, discovers that he's the winner." Crowther also liked the supporting performances of George Tobias and Jack Carson. On Rotten Tomatoes, the film has an aggregate score of 100% based on 9 critic reviews, with an average rating of 7.8/10.

The entertainment trade publication Variety liked it as well: "Cagney and de Havilland provide topnotch performances that do much to keep up interest in the proceedings. Rita Hayworth is an eyeful as the title character, while Jack Carson is excellent as the politically ambitious antagonist of the dentist."

In Halliwell's Film Guide (1994), reviewer Leslie Halliwell describes the production as a "pleasant period comedy drama" and recognizes its three stars and cinematographer James Wong Howe for their outstanding contributions.

In 1998, Jonathan Rosenbaum of the Chicago Reader included the film in his unranked list of the best American films not included on the AFI Top 100.

Soundtrack
 The Band Played On
 Music by Chas. B. Ward
 Lyrics by John F. Palmer
 Won't You Come Home Bill Bailey
 Music and Lyrics by Hughie Cannon
 Meet Me in St. Louis, Louis
 Music by Kerry Mills
 Lyrics by Andrew B. Sterling
 In the Evening by the Moonlight
 Music and Lyrics by James Allen Bland
 Wait Till the Sun Shines, Nellie
 Music by Harry von Tilzer
 Lyrics by Andrew Sterling
 The Fountain in the Park
 Music by Ed Haley
 The Red, White and Blue, aka Columbia, the Gem of the Ocean
 Written by David T. Shaw
 Arranged by Thomas A. Beckett
 In the Good Old Summertime
 Music by George Evans
 A Life on the Ocean Wave
 Music by Henry Russell
 Love Me, and the World Is Mine
 Music by Ernest Ball
 Lyrics by Dave Reed Jr.
 In the Shade of the Old Apple Tree
 Music by Egbert Van Alstyne
 In My Merry Oldsmobile
 Music by Gus Edwards
 Let the Rest of the World Go By
 Music by Ernest Ball
 Lyrics by J. Keirn Brennan
 When You Were Sweet Sixteen
 Written by James Thornton
 The Bowery
 Music by Percy Gaunt

Home media
Strawberry Blonde was released on both VHS and in a DVD edition through the Warner Archive Collection.

References

External links 

 
 
 
 

1941 films
1941 musical comedy films
1941 romantic comedy films
American black-and-white films
American films based on plays
American musical comedy films
American romantic comedy films
American romantic musical films
1940s English-language films
Films directed by Raoul Walsh
Films produced by Hal B. Wallis
Films scored by Heinz Roemheld
Films set in New York City
Films set in the 1890s
Films with screenplays by Philip G. Epstein
Films with screenplays by Julius J. Epstein
Warner Bros. films
1940s American films